The Religion of Falun Gong is a 2012 nonfiction book by Benjamin Penny, published by the University of Chicago Press, that discusses the Falun Gong's belief system.

The publisher stated that sources often did not include much analysis of Falun Gong beliefs but instead examined the group's political factors.

Penny's main argument is that Falun Gong functions as a religion even if the Chinese government, Li Hongzhi, and other people involved in Falun Gong do not publicly regard it as such.

Reception
The book won the CHOICE Outstanding Academic Title Awards from Choice Magazine.

David Ownby of the Université de Montréal wrote that the book "convincingly illustrates the validity of treating Falun Gong as a religion" although Ownby noted this conclusion does not address the "quality" of the Falun Gong.

Paul Hedges of the University of Winchester wrote that the book "is an important contribution".

Gerda Wielander of the University of Westminster described the book as "A wonderful piece of Sinological research". She stated that the sourcing is "meticulous" but this sometimes results in the reading being "dry".

References
  - Profile, see Page on ProQuest

Notes

External links
 The Religion of Falun Gong

2012 non-fiction books
Falun Gong
University of Chicago Press books